Naphthol yellow S is an organic compound that is a dye.  It is a derivative of 1-naphthol.  At one time it was a popular food colorant but it was delisted in 1959 in the U.S.

References

Acid dyes
Naphthalenesulfonates
Nitronaphthalenes
Organic sodium salts